is the second installment in Toei's Metal Hero Series franchise and aired on TV Asahi from March 4, 1983 to February 24, 1984. It served as a direct sequel to its predecessor, Space Sheriff Gavan and featured many of the same characters. It was aired in the Philippines on RPN from 1986 to 1987.

For distribution purposes, Toei refers to this television series as Space Guardian Shariban.

Plot
Initially appearing in Space Sheriff Gavan, Den Iga is attacked by a monster called Buffalo Doubler, a member of the Space Mafia Makuu. Den is seriously injured in the attack when he is found by Gavan, who takes him to Planet Bird for medical assistance. Den returns in the final episode of Gavan, saving Gavan himself in his newly acquired form of Space Sheriff Sharivan during Gavan's final battle. After Don Horror is defeated, Sharivan is assigned to Earth and is partnered together with Lily from the planet Bird as he deals with the threat of the Madou Space Crime Syndicate on Earth.

Characters

Grand Berth crew
It has two modes: Battle Mothership move able to fires the Berth Beam and the vaguely humanoid Battle Birth Formation that fires the Grand Buster and Plasma Cannon (the latter being based on the blueprints of the Space Cannon built by Voicer, Gavan's father).

  Originally from Inner Iga Island, he served as forest patroller until fatally wounded by Buffalo Doubler and saved by Gavan who brought him to Planet Bird to undergo special training to become Space Sheriff Sharivan, aiding Gavan during his final battle with the Makuu before assigned to protect Earth in his predecessor's place. When he transforms with the command , the Grand Berth envelops him with Solar Metal particles that it absorbs from solar flares to form his armor within milliseconds. As Sharivan, he uses the Laser Blade sword in his signature move Sharivan Grash or the Crime-Buster hand gun. Sharivan uses Prism Goggles to see clearly the object. It is a rectangular yellow glasses with crystal particles.
  Sharivan's girlfriend from Planet Bird.

Arsenal
  Sharivan's motorcycle, capable of entry into the Phantom Dream World.
  Sharivan's tank, which splits into a flying upper half and treaded lower half.
  Sharivan's drill-headed vehicle.

Galactic Union Patrol
Captain Gavan  The Space Sheriff who was previously assigned on Earth.
 (27 and 50)  The anti-Madou resistance, represented by Moore, Keith, and Rita, who aid Sharivan.
 (51)  The mystical warriors from Iga Planet to protect the wonders and civilizations of the Iga Crystal. Membered by Jack, Henry, Maria and Kirk
 (36-42)  Iga warrior siblings trained to be Space Sheriffs. After Billy is killed, Helen becomes Sharivan's apprentice to avenge his death.

Space Crime Syndicate Madou
The   is an organization of psychic criminals whose headquarters, lies within the  dimension, a "white hole" where all the matter sucked up by black holes ends up. The syndicate intends to conquer the universe through chaos created by its members' psionic abilities, along with their space fighters and the Madou Battleship.

  The immobile ruler of Madou, able to project his consciousness into multiple forms such as his fully mobile cyborg body Psychorror which is armed with twin swords that emit lightning bolts. With Gavan dealing with Psychorror, Sharivan destroys Psycho. However, by the events of Kamen Rider × Super Sentai × Space Sheriff: Super Hero Taisen Z which introduced a detachment from his conscious named Psycholon, Psycho's true body is revealed to be Genmu Castle itself as he is revived from the energy of the Galactic Union Police's Super Dimension Cannon. However, Psycho is destroyed for good by the teamwork of the Space Sheriffs, the Kyoryugers and Kamen Rider Wizard.
 (1-49)  A black-armored field commander who is defeated by Sharivan. In the cross-over movie, Retsu, Den and Dai mistakenly thought Gyrer had revived, but he was actually a vendor who just looks like Gyrer, much to the Trio's Surprise.
  A female strategist who dies fighting against Sharivan and Gavan.
 (34-50): A mystic from the Death Spirit World who intended to take over Madou, only to be destroyed by Psychorror. But during the events of Kamen Rider × Super Sentai × Space Sheriff: Super Hero Taisen Z, Reider revived to aid in Psycho's resurrection through the Space Shocker organization he provides his magic to. Though killed, Reider is revived as Space Reider before being destroyed for good by Kamen Ride Beast and Kyoryu Gold.
  Gyrer, and Doctor Polter's female aides. Miss Akuma 2 was devoured by Gamagon. Miss Akuma 1 was killed along with her mistress while fighting Sharivan and Gavan.
  Also referred to as Fighters, they serve as the foot soldiers of Madou in black tights decorated with lightning bolts.
Bengel Brothers  A pair of space pirates from Dark Cloud Mazalan that appear in episode 11 that briefly join the Madou named Bengel Tiger and Bengel Cobra. Both of them are quickly killed off by Sharivan's Crime Buster and their data was used to create Shouri Beast. Bengel Tiger's powers include mines, a sword, cloaking, hand flames called the Bengel Fire, explosive thread, and a bowie knife. Bengel Cobra's powers include mines, a spear, cloaking, hand flames called the Bengel Fire, explosive thread, and a wrist claw.

Makai Beasts

 are the monsters created by Psycho which usually have a two-mode gimmick. During a fight with Sharivan, a Makai Beast retreats into the Phantom Dream World where it becomes four times more powerful in an attempt to get the upper hand against Sharivan.

 Gori Beast  This monster appeared in episode 1. Its powers include curling into a saw bladed ball, high jumping, a head shell, a kilaj sword, and a halberd. When Madou arrives on Earth, Sharivan fights against them and defeats them. Afterwards Psycho wants Sharivan to be killed so he creates the Gori Beast to do it. After saving the kids from the Madou, Sharivan fights them at the railroad tracks as well as Gori Beast. Psycho gets Dr. Polter to activate a device that would send Sharivan and Gori Beast to the Vision World where Gori Beast will become four times more powerful. Sharivan kills it with Sharivan Crush. 
 Ei Beast  This monster appeared in episode 2. Its powers include gliding, a mentally controlled spear, teleportation, and summoning holograms. After Sharivan runs into Madou when they start to make strange events happen on Earth, Psycho creates the Ei Beast to kill Sharivan. It can fold its wings above its head to use its spear. After fighting Ei Beast in the Vision World, Sharivan kills it with Sharivan Crush.
 Kiba Beast  This monster appeared in episode 3. Its powers include teleportation, explosive electric streams and eye flashes, and a mentally controlled forked spear. After Den meets a little girl named Kumiko whose father never returned home from work due to his job, he investigates the building he works at and finds out that the Madou are using him to develop a missile to destroy the Grand Birth. Den gets discovered but he manages to save Kumiko's father as he fights off the Madou. When Den fights them off as Sharivan, Lily leads Kumiko's father outside but they get stopped by Kiba Beast. Sharivan manages to save them with his Crime Buster and destroy the building they were developing the missile at. However Psycho kidnapes Yumiko before Den and her father could arrive in time. Fortunately Den gave Kumiko a tracking device so that he will know her location. When he follows it he is confronted by Madou but he is able to save Kumiko and kill Kiba Beast with Sharivan Crush.
Maicon Beast This monster appeared in episode 4. Its powers include a mentally controlled pincer claw staff, teleportation, invisibility, and explosive electric streams. It was created as part of Madou's plan to control humanity with computers as he is able to control them. When Den investigates, Polter has the computers rigged with chips that will explode when Den is near them. So instead he gets Lily to investigate the factory where the computers are built. Lily gets discovered but Den fights them off as well as destroying the factory. Madou later kidnaps a student who was using the computers to lure out Sharivan. When he saves him, the Madou attack him. Den transforms into Sharivan and fights them off. Sharivan kills Computer Beast with Sharivan Crash.
 Sound Beast  This monster appeared in episode 5. Its powers include a human disguise, a flute that enhances telekinesis, teleportation, and a crescent bladed staff. Created as part of Madou's plan to unlock hidden psychokinetic abilities within humans to turn them into espers and make them part of Madou. Disguised as a human, Sound Beast has a man named Tokio work for him to bring him any human. Tokio has a girlfriend named Yumiko who faked having amnesia to get away from Madou after a motorcycle crash. Psycho later orders Yumiko to be killed when he discovers that she did not lose her memory. When Tokio refuses to do it, Sound Beast attempts to do it instead. Tokio tries to stop him but Sound Beast uses his flute to telekinetically throw him around and he dies of his injuries. This enrages Dai and he transforms into Sharivan. Sound Beast fights him in the Vision World attempting to kill him but is destroyed by Sharivan Crash despite its efforts.
 Yamagami Beast  This monster appeared in episode 6. Its powers include high jumping, a mentally controlled spear, emitting electric surges, teleportation, and a chain. When Madou discovers that Den is a former forest ranger, they had Mountain God Beast attack the forest. Dai pursues them but is lured into a trap and attacked by bats that affect his senses. Mountain God Beast fights the weakened Den as he cannot transform into Sharivan due to the cage rendering his Crimson Shine useless as well as being infected by the bats. They even threaten to kill the animals if Den does not continue fighting. Mountain God Beast brutally beats Den and his about to finish him off but Gavan rescues him and transforms into Sharivan. In the Vision world, Sharivan fights Mountain God Beast and finishes him off with Sharivan Crash.
 Double Beast  This monster appeared in episode 7. Its powers include teleportation, possessing espers, a clawed staff, and explosive torches. It heavily resembles the xenomorph drone from the original Alien. This Demon Monster is created as part of Madou's plan to turn girls with ESP into evil psychics that will serve the Madou. One of the girls is Sachiko who Double Beast possessed. After saving her, Den fights Double Beast and kills him with Sharivan Crash.
 Doku Beast  This monster appeared in episode 8. Its powers include invisibility, dioxin spray from the mouth, a scythe, and a sword. This Demon Monster is used in Madou's plan to pollute the environment using dioxin which is lethal poison that kills any living thing including humans. Sharivan destroys him with Sharivan Crash.
 Cash Beast  This monster appeared in episode 9. Its powers include teleportation, a mentally controlled staff with a mace at the end that emits electric surges, mirages, controlling and spawning doors, invisibility, and a sword. It was part of the Madou's plan to take control of world companies and eventually the economy using counterfeit money. After Sharivan fights the Madou he destroys the counterfeit money factory but it was actually a fake factory used by the Madou to trick Sharivan. The real factory is the haunted house that is part of a Madou plan and is owned by Cash Beast disguised as an old man. When Jirou, Kojiro and his friends investigate the house Cash Beast scares them away. Sharivan fights Cash Beast and destroys him with Sharivan Crash. Afterwards Sharivan destroys the real counterfeit money factory in the haunted house finally putting an end to Madou's plan for good. 
 UFO Beast  This monster appeared in episode 10. Its powers include retracting his body into his saucer-like helmet, launchable pincer claw gloves, mentally controlling his helmet, a bladed ring and a gun on the saucer helmet, a mace ended staff, and a sword. UFO Beast is first seen trying to kill Kojirou when he is discovered taking pictures of their shuttles transporting materials for a cannon. Sharivan fights UFO Beast and he retreats. The Madou destroy the detection equipment so they can proceed with their plan. Sharivan is able to destroy the cannon and kill UFO Beast with Sharivan Crash.
 Shouri Beast  This monster appeared in episode 11. Its powers include high jumping, a mentally controlled spear that emits electric shocks, and flames from the left palm. Victory Beast is created using Sharivan's data analyzed by the Bengal Brothers. The Bengal Brothers are brainwashed into cyborgs as punishment for attempting to overthrow Psycho. The three of them fight Sharivan resulting in the Bengal Brothers killed. Victory Beast fights Sharivan gaining the upper hand against him but his injuries are not enough to slow him down and he finally uses Sharivan Crash against Victory Beast killing him
 Ocarina Beast  This monster appeared in episode 12. Its powers include teleportation, a hypnotic ocarina that can turn into a harpoon, and a sword. Ocarina Beast poses as a friendly alien to hypnotize people turning them into slaves so that the Madou can invade Earth. Sharivan fights Ocarina and kills him with Sharivan Crash.
 Boxer Beast  This monster appeared in episode 13. Its powers include a human disguise, a boxing glove for the left hand that can turn into a staff, invisibility, high jumping, and a sword. 
 Killer Beast  This monster appeared in episode 14. Its powers include a human disguise, a detachable floating head, a crescent bladed staff that emits electric shocks, high jumping, summoning fire, and a sword. 
 Shikake Beast  This monster appeared in episode 15. Its powers include a clubbed staff that emits electric shocks, a human disguise, turning into a rock, explosive mouth mist, a long tongue, and a sword with a gun on the handle.
 Maboroshi Beast  This monster appeared in episode 16. Its powers include a human disguise, transparency, retracting into his cloak, a mentally controlled spear, mirages, face ramming, and a sword.
 Magma Beast  This monster appeared in episode 17. Its powers include a spear, fire manipulation, teleportation, lava sparks from the head, and a sword.
 Same Beast  This monster appeared in episode 18. Its powers include teleportation, emitting white smoke, swimming, high jumping, invisibility, a staff with a club at the end, and a spiked sword.
 Kataribe Beast  This monster appeared in episodes 19 and 20. Its powers include a human disguise, a mentally controlled staff with a club at the end that emits electricity, teleportation, high jumping, mouth bombs, and a sword.
 Utsubo Beast  This monster appeared in episode 21. Its powers include sharp teeth, a staff with a mace that emits electric shocks, high jumping, teleportation, and a sword.
 Shinigami Beast  This monster appeared in episode 22. Its powers include a human disguise, illusions, possession, high jumping, a scythe that can turn into a sword, and an explosive levitating cloak.
 Nimen Beast  This monster appeared in episode 23. Its powers include a human disguise, teleportation, and an explosive spear.
 Virus Beast  This monster appeared in episode 24. Its powers include a human disguise, energy sapping virus mouth mist, beetles with energy sapping virus mouth mist and can explode, gliding, a pitch fork, mouth webs, and a sword.
 Nikui Beast  This monster appeared in episode 25. Its powers include a human disguise, telekinesis, a hooked staff that can emit hot sparks, and a sword that emits electric shocks.
 Keiki Beast  This monster appeared in episode 26. Its powers include a human disguise, telekinesis, teleportation, super speed, high jumping, a mentally controlled ax, and a sword.
 Uragiri Beast  This monster appeared in episode 27. Its powers include a glaive and a high resistance to pain.
 Gakuen Beast  This monster appeared in episode 28. Its powers include teleportation, a human disguise, throwing giant explosive leaves, spawning athletes, and a sword.
 Heiki Beast  This monster appeared in episode 29. Its powers include a human disguise, a shoulder energy cannon, a sword, a laser rifle, and explosive throwing knives.
 Henshin Beast  This monster appeared in episode 30. Its powers include a human disguise, a glaive, high jumping, dividing into four gunmen, teleportation, and a mummy disguise with explosive constricting bandages.
 Kodai Beast  This monster appeared in episode 31. Its powers include super strength, a spear, summoning flying rocks, and a sword.
 Jekyll-Hyde Beast  This monster appeared in episode 32. Its powers include a human disguise, an ax that contains a sword, invisibility, and levitation.
 Shunkan Beast  This monster appeared in episode 33. Its powers include teleportation, a mentally controlled glaive, shoulder shields, and a sword.
 Hyakume Beast  This monster appeared in episode 34. Its powers include teleportation, a high heat resistance, telekinesis, a coiling tongue that emits electric shocks, a spear, and a sword.
 Washi Beast  This monster appeared in episode 35. Its powers include gliding, high jumping, a spear, illusions, signal jamming, arrestors, and a sword.
 Bunri Beast  This monster appeared in episode 36. Its powers include splitting into two different monsters, constricting electric tentacles, summoning vines, and a club that can turn into a sword.
 Kuma Beast  This monster appeared in episode 37. Its powers include a human disguise, a scythe, high jumping, and a jagged sword.
 Asura Beast  This monster appeared in episode 38. Its powers include swimming, a human disguise, a staff with a torch at the end, teleportation, an electric cloth, and a sword.
 Doll Beast  This monster appeared in episode 39. Its powers include converting into a doll armed with a mouth gun, a rake staff, levitation, telepathy, doll bombs, mouth mist, a detachable head, teleportation, high jumping, and a sword.
 Yogen Beast  This monster appeared in episode 40. Its powers include foresight, a human disguise, a trident that can turn into a sword, teleportation, and levitation.
 Anahori Beast  This monster appeared in episode 41. Its powers include burrowing, shovel claws for hands, a nose drill, a forked staff, fast sliding, and a sword.
 Mukuro Beast  This monster appeared in episode 42. Its powers include high jumping, a staff, summoning electric triangles and fissures, and a sword.
 Reikai Beast  This monster appeared in episode 43. Its powers include using souls as a human disguise with extending arms, energy draining eye bolts, telekinesis, teleportation, a pitch fork, high jumping, reviving dead Makai beasts, and a sword.
 Ankou Beast  This monster appeared in episode 44. Its powers include an extending head probe with knockout gas, teleportation, eye beams that keep creatures asleep, a sickle staff, and a sword.
 Yukai Beast  This monster appeared in episode 45. Its powers include teleportation, a trident, a human disguise, and high jumping.
 Present Beast  This monster appeared in episode 46. Its powers include a mentally controlled spear that emits electric shocks and can turn into a machine gun, invisibility, high jumping, and a sword.
 Kenkyaku Beast  This monster appeared in episode 47. Its powers include a human disguise, the magic sword, high jumping, and telekinesis.
 BEM Sasori  This monster appeared in episode 48. Its powers include a throwing knife, a launch able right arm pincer claw, high jumping, and a sword.

Episodes
  (Original Airdate: March 4, 1983): written by Shozo Uehara, directed by Yoshiaki Kobayashi
  (Original Airdate: March 11, 1983): written by Shozo Uehara, directed by Yoshiaki Kobayashi
  (Original Airdate: March 18, 1983): written by Shozo Uehara, directed by Hideo Tanaka
  (Original Airdate: March 25, 1983): written by Shozo Uehara, directed by Hideo Tanaka
  (Original Airdate: April 1, 1983): written by Shozo Uehara, directed by Takeshi Ogasawara
  (Original Airdate: April 8, 1983): written by Shozo Uehara, directed by Takeshi Ogasawara
  (Original Airdate: April 15, 1983): written by Shozo Uehara, directed by Yoshiaki Kobayashi
  (Original Airdate: April 22, 1983): written by Susumu Takaku, directed by Yoshiaki Kobayashi
  (Original Airdate: April 29, 1983): written by Shozo Uehara, directed by Hideo Tanaka
  (Original Airdate: May 6, 1983): written by Shozo Uehara, directed by Hideo Tanaka
  (Original Airdate: May 13, 1983): written by Shozo Uehara, directed by Takeshi Ogasawara
  (Original Airdate: May 20, 1983): written by Shozo Uehara, directed by Takeshi Ogasawara
  (Original Airdate: May 27, 1983): written by Shozo Uehara, directed by Hideo Tanaka
  (Original Airdate: June 3, 1983): written by Susumu Takaku, directed by Hideo Tanaka
  (Original Airdate: June 10, 1983): written by Shozo Uehara, directed by Makoto Tsuji
  (Original Airdate: June 17, 1983): written by Shozo Uehara, directed by Makoto Tsuji
  (Original Airdate: June 24, 1983): written by Shozo Uehara, directed by Takeshi Ogasawara
  (Original Airdate: July 1, 1983): written by Shozo Uehara, directed by Takeshi Ogasawara
  (Original Airdate: July 8, 1983): written by Shozo Uehara, directed by Yoshiaki Kobayashi
  (Original Airdate: July 15, 1983): written by Shozo Uehara, directed by Yoshiaki Kobayashi
  (Original Airdate: July 22, 1983): written by Shozo Uehara, directed by Hideo Tanaka
  (Original Airdate: July 29, 1983): written by Susumu Takaku, directed by Hideo Tanaka
  (Original Airdate: August 5, 1983): written by Susumu Takaku, directed by Takeshi Ogasawara
  (Original Airdate: August 19, 1983): written by Shozo Uehara, directed by Takeshi Ogasawara
  (Original Airdate: August 26, 1983): written by Shozo Uehara, directed by Hideo Tanaka
  (Original Airdate: September 2, 1983): written by Shozo Uehara, directed by Hideo Tanaka
  (Original Airdate: September 9, 1983): written by Susumu Takaku, directed by Takeshi Ogasawara
  (Original Airdate: September 16, 1983): written by Shozo Uehara, directed by Takeshi Ogasawara
  (Original Airdate: September 23, 1983): written by Shozo Uehara, directed by Hideo Tanaka
  (Original Airdate: September 30, 1983): written by Shozo Uehara, directed by Hideo Tanaka
  (Original Airdate: October 7, 1983): written by Shozo Uehara, directed by Yoshiaki Kobayashi
  (Original Airdate: October 14, 1983): written by Shozo Uehara, directed by Yoshiaki Kobayashi
  (Original Airdate: October 21, 1983): written by Susumu Takaku, directed by Takeshi Ogasawara
  (Original Airdate: October 28, 1983): written by Shozo Uehara, directed by Takeshi Ogasawara
  (Original Airdate: November 4, 1983): written by Shozo Uehara, directed by Hideo Tanaka
  (Original Airdate: November 11, 1983): written by Shozo Uehara, directed by Hideo Tanaka
  (Original Airdate: November 18, 1983): written by Susumu Takaku, directed by Takeshi Ogasawara
  (Original Airdate: November 25, 1983): written by Shozo Uehara, directed by Takeshi Ogasawara
  (Original Airdate: December 2, 1983): written by Shozo Uehara, directed by Hideo Tanaka
  (Original Airdate: December 9, 1983): written by Shozo Uehara, directed by Hideo Tanaka
  (Original Airdate: December 16, 1983): written by Shozo Uehara, directed by Michio Konishi
  (Original Airdate: December 23, 1983): written by Shozo Uehara, directed by Michio Konishi
  (Original Airdate: December 30, 1983): written by Susumu Takaku, directed by Hideo Tanaka
  (Original Airdate: January 6, 1984): written by Shozo Uehara, directed by Hideo Tanaka
  (Original Airdate: January 13, 1984): written by Shozo Uehara, directed by Hideo Tanaka
  (Original Airdate: January 20, 1984): written by Keiji Kubota, directed by Michio Konishi
  (Original Airdate: January 27, 1984): written by Akiyuki Yuyama, directed by Michio Konishi
  (Original Airdate: February 3, 1984): written by Shozo Uehara, directed by Hideo Tanaka
  (Original Airdate: February 10, 1984): written by Shozo Uehara, directed by Hideo Tanaka
  (Original Airdate: February 17, 1984): written by Shozo Uehara, directed by Hideo Tanaka
  (Original Airdate: February 24, 1984): written by Shozo Uehara, directed by Hideo Tanaka

Cast
 Den Iga  Hiroshi Watari
 Lily  Yumiko Furuya
 Retsu Ichijouji  Kenji Ohba
 Mimi  Wakiko Kano
 Commander Qom  Toshiaki Nishizawa
 Marin  Kyoko Nashiro
 Kojiro Oyama  Masayuki Suzuki
 Kappei Suzuki  Gozo Soma
 Chiaki Suzuki  Midori Nakagawa
 Chie Suzuki  Yukari Aoki
 Akira Suzuki  Katsuya Koiso
 Saint  Takeshi Watabe
 Demon King Psycho  Shōzō Iizuka
 Doctor Polter  Hitomi Yoshioka
 General Gyrer  Satoshi Kurihara
 Miss Akuma 1  Chieko Maruyama (1-22, 48-51), Miyuki Nagato (23-47)
 Miss Akuma 2  Lala (1-22), Yui Mizuki (23-50)
 Umibōzu  Kazuyoshi Yamada
 Narrator  Issei Masamune

Guest Stars
 Boxer Beast (13)/Keith  (27, 50):  Toshimichi Takahashi
 Denichiro Iga (13, 20, 35, 49, 51 - flashback):  Tsunehiko Kamijo 
 Tsukiko Hoshino (15, 34): Aiko Tachibana
 Hunter Killer (15 - flashback): Michiro Iida 
 San Dorva (15 - flashback): Ken Nishida
 Voicer (15 - flashback): Sonny Chiba
 Miyuki (19-20, 31, 49-51): Sumiko Kakizaki
 Iga Girls (19-20, 31, 49-51)
 Mai Oishi 
 Yukari Imaizumi
 Kumi Shimada (19-20, 31)
 Naohko Nomoto (19-20)
 Noriko Kojima (19-20)
 Mihoko Nomoto (31)
 Misa Nirei (31)
 Miho Shimoji (49-51)
 Mami Yoshikawa (49-51)
 Shinigami Beast (22 - human form): Machiko Soga
 Rita (27, 36, 50): Sherry
 Moore (27):  Isamu Shimizu
 Reider (34 - 50): Mitsuo Ando 
 Yuhko Iga (35, 39, 51 - flashback):  Yukiko Yoshino (Played as Keiko Yoshino)
 Helen Bell (36, 38, 39, 42):  Yuki Yajima
 Helen Bell (38 - child):  Rie Yoshizawa

Songs 

Both pieces are performed by Akira Kushida, with lyrics by Keisuke Yamakawa and composition and arrangement by Michiaki Watanabe.

References

Metal Hero Series
Japanese science fiction television series
Western (genre) peace officers
1983 Japanese television series debuts
1984 Japanese television series endings
Space adventure television series
Space Western television series
TV Asahi original programming